The Very Best of The Doors is a compilation album by The Doors, released in the USA in 2001. It features the same cover art as The Best of The Doors compilation released the previous year, and a similar track listing to the single CD version of that album.

Critical reception

Andy Hermann of PopMatters wrote in his review that with a few exceptions, The Very Best of the Doors is "as good an overview as any of the band's biggest hits and most important songs, all in their original album versions".

Track listing
"Break On Through (To the Other Side)" – 2:29
"Light My Fire" – 7:08
"People Are Strange" – 2:12
"Riders on the Storm" – 7:15
"L.A. Woman" – 7:52
"Love Her Madly" – 3:20
"Back Door Man" – 3:34
"Touch Me" – 3:12
"Hello, I Love You" – 2:16
"Love Me Two Times" – 3:16
"Twentieth Century Fox" – 2:34
"The Crystal Ship" – 2:34
"The WASP (Texas Radio and the Big Beat)" – 4:15
"Peace Frog" – 3:00
"The End" – 11:45
"Roadhouse Blues" (Live) (Version found on The Doors: Box Set (1997) & Essential Rarities (1999)) – 4:32

Personnel
Jim Morrison – vocals
Ray Manzarek – organ, piano, keyboards & bass
Robby Krieger – guitar
John Densmore – drums
Paul A. Rothchild – producer of all tracks except for tracks 4-6 & 13
Bruce Botnick – co-producer of tracks 4-6 & 13
Jerry Scheff – bass guitar on tracks 4-6 & 13
Douglass Lubahn – bass guitar on tracks 3 & 9-10
 Larry Knechtel (uncredited) – bass guitar on track 2
 Curtis Amy – saxophone solo on track 8
 George Bohanan – trombone
 Harvey Brooks – bass guitar on track 8
 Paul Harris – orchestral arrangements on track 8
 Ray Neapolitan – bass guitar on track 14
 Marc Benno – additional guitar on track 5

Certifications

References

Albums produced by Paul A. Rothchild
Albums produced by Bruce Botnick
Elektra Records compilation albums
The Doors compilation albums
2001 greatest hits albums